Tele Samad (8 January 1945 – 6 April 2019) was a Bangladeshi actor. He acted in over 600 films.

Background
Samad studied at the Faculty of Fine Arts, University of Dhaka.

Career
Samad made his debut in 1973 film Kar Bou, directed by Nazrul Islam. He got his breakthrough in the film Noyonmoni, directed by Amjad Hossain. He also performed as a playback singer in more than 50 films. He served as the music director of the film Mona Pagla.

Personal life
Samad suffered from different medical complications including kidney and heart problems and infections in his leg and had undergone a leg operation. He died on 6 April 2019 at the age of 74.

Filmography

References

External links
 

1945 births
2019 deaths
People from Munshiganj District
University of Dhaka Faculty of Fine Arts alumni
Bangladeshi male film actors
Bangladeshi comedians
Bangladeshi male television actors
Bangladeshi playback singers